

Explorations
 Spring: Explorations at Timna in Yemen by Wendell Phillips of the American Foundation for the Study of Man (continues in 1951).

Excavations
 Excavations at Stonehenge by R. J. C. Atkinson, Stuart Piggott and J. F. S. Stone.
 Excavations at Wharram Percy by Maurice Beresford begin.
 Excavations at Beitin.
 Excavations at Gordium by the University of Pennsylvania Museum under Rodney S. Young begin.

Finds
 March 1 - A hoard of Roman coins is discovered at Hordley Grange, Shropshire, England.
 May 8 - A bog body known as "Tollund Man" is discovered in Denmark.
 The Upchurch Hoard is discovered in Upchurch, Kent, England.
 A third premolar is discovered in materials sent back to Sweden by Otto Zdansky from his excavations of the Peking Man site at Zhoukoudian, China in 1921 and 1923.
 Balfarg, a prehistoric site in Fife, Scotland, is discovered through air photography.
 Three Roman mosaic pavements are found at Harpham in the East Riding of Yorkshire, England.
 Stabiae rediscovered.
 The Garima Gospels at Abba Garima Monastery first become known to Western scholars.

Publications

 T. C. Lethbridge - Herdsmen and Hermits: Celtic Seafarers in the Northern Seas.
 V. E. Nash-Williams - The Early Christian Monuments of Wales.

Births
 January 25 - Phil Harding, English field archaeologist
 Wafaa El Saddik, Egyptian Egyptologist

Deaths
 January 27 - Herbert Eustis Winlock, American Egyptologist who worked for the New York Metropolitan Museum of Art (b. 1884)

References

Archaeology
Archaeology
Archaeology by year